Giant Eagle, Inc. and stylized as giant eagle)  is an American supermarket chain with stores in Pennsylvania, Ohio, West Virginia, Indiana,  and Maryland. The company was founded in 1918 in Pittsburgh, Pennsylvania, and incorporated on August 31, 1931. Supermarket News ranked Giant Eagle 21st on the "Top 75 North American Food Retailers" based on sales of $11 billion. In 2021, it was the 36th-largest privately held company, as determined by Forbes. Based on 2005 revenue, Giant Eagle is the 49th-largest retailer in the United States. As of Summer 2014, the company had approximately $9.9 billion in annual sales. As of Summer 2022, Giant Eagle, Inc. had 490 stores across the portfolio.  216 supermarkets (Giant Eagle, Giant Eagle Express, Market District, Market District Express) and 274 fuel station/convenience stores under the GetGo banner. The company is headquartered in an office park in the Pittsburgh suburb of O'Hara Township.

History

After World War I, three Pittsburgh-area families—the Goldsteins, Porters, and Chaits—built a grocery chain called Eagle Grocery. In 1928, Eagle, now 125 stores strong, merged with Kroger. The three families agreed to stay out of the grocery business for at least three years.

Meanwhile, the Moravitz and Weizenbaum families built their own successful chain of grocery stores named OK Grocery. In 1931, OK Grocery merged with Eagle Grocery to form Giant Eagle, which was incorporated two years later. Giant Eagle quickly expanded across western Pennsylvania, weathering the Great Depression and World War II.

The chain remained based solely in western Pennsylvania until the 1980s, when it bought Youngstown, Ohio-based wholesaler Tamarkin Company, and its Valu-King stores that were converted to the Giant Eagle name. The Kent and Ravenna stores were the first to be converted at that time; the Youngstown stores then got converted years later. Around the mid- or late 1990s, Giant Eagle later reached Cleveland by acquiring the Rini- Rego Stop-n-Shop stores in the area. Rini- Rego Stop-n-Shop stores were family owned and operated in different areas of Cleveland. The family operators of Rini- Rego Stop-n-Shop formed a holding company named International Seaway Foods as the main umbrella for Rini- Rego Stop-n-Shop. In 1998, Giant Eagle acquired the International Seaway Foods and converted the Rini- Rego Stop-n-Shop Stores into Giant Eagle Stores. Giant Eagle also purchased or opened other Northeast Ohio stores outside the Stop-n-Shop area, such as the former Apples supermarkets in the nearby Akron area.

The company entered the Toledo market, opening two stores in 2001 and 2004, both of which have now closed. Giant Eagle emerged as one of the dominant supermarket chains in Northeast Ohio, competing mainly against the New York-based Tops, from which it purchased 18 stores in October 2006. The purchases came as Tops exited the Northeast Ohio area.

Giant Eagle purchased independently owned County Market stores, giving it a store in Somerset, Pennsylvania, a new store in Johnstown, Pennsylvania, and its first Maryland stores: one in Cumberland, one in Hagerstown, and two in Frederick. The Cumberland store closed in December 2003, and the Hagerstown store closed in August 2005. 

Giant Eagle has aggressively expanded its footprint in the Greater Columbus area, capitalizing on the demise of the former Big Bear supermarket chain, and taking Big Bear's traditional place as Columbus's upmarket grocer. Giant Eagle first entered what it calls its "Columbus Region" in late 2000, opening three large newly built stores at Sawmill and Bethel Rd., Lewis Center, and Dublin-Granville Rd., with two more following in 2002 and 2003 at Gahanna and Hilliard-Rome Rd. The Hilliard-Rome Rd. location closed in early 2017. In 2004, Giant Eagle purchased nine former Big Bear stores in Columbus, Newark, and Marietta from parent company Penn Traffic. Giant Eagle has since expanded to several additional locations, acquiring other abandoned Big Bear stores and in newly constructed buildings using the current Giant Eagle prototype. Giant Eagle opened its 20th Columbus-area store at New Albany Road at the Ohio Rt. 161 freeway (New Albany) in August 2007, its 21st area store at Hayden Run and Cosgray Roads (Dublin) in November 2007, its 22nd area store at Stelzer and McCutcheon Roads (Columbus) in July 2008 and its 23rd area store at South Hamilton Road and Winchester Pike (Groveport) in August 2008. A new Giant Eagle opened in Lancaster, in November 2008, and the former Big Bear located at Blacklick Crossing is undergoing an expansion and remodeling.

On September 27, 2018, Giant Eagle announced it would purchase the Ricker's convenience store chain in Indiana, marking the largest acquisition for GetGo since the chain's launch. It is not known if the Ricker's chain will be integrated into the GetGo brand following the closure of the deal. Much as it has done in Pennsylvania alongside Sheetz, GetGo plans to join Ricker's in having Indiana change their laws regarding alcohol sales.

Loyalty program

In 1991, Giant Eagle introduced the "Advantage Card", an electronic loyalty card discount system (already popular in many chains), as a sophisticated version of the obsolete stamp programs. The card was later modified to double as a video rental card for Iggle Video. More recently the company has started the Fuelperks! program to entice customers. This program allows customers the opportunity to earn 10 cents off each gallon of gas (20 cents in select markets) with fifty dollars' worth of authorized purchases. In early 2009, Giant Eagle launched the Foodperks! program, mainly geared towards GetGo. This program allows customers who use their fuelperks! at GetGo to also earn foodperks! to save on groceries purchased at Giant Eagle. Every 10 gallons of gas purchased earns a 1% discount. This can be used up to 20% maximum at a time on a purchase of up to $300. Foodperks! are valid for 90 days and fuelperks! are valid for 60 days. If the customer has more than the price of gasoline or more than the 20%, those discounts will stay on their card for the remainder of the 90/60 days, and if they are not used by then, they expire. In February 2013, Giant Eagle announced that they would be discontinuing the foodperks! program that month because it was "a little too complex".

In 2017, Giant Eagle began implementing fuelperks+, an enhancement to the existing fuelperks program that reintroduces the benefits of the previous foodperks benefit which had been discontinued in 2013. Under the new fuelperks+ program, customers earn one perk per dollar spent at Giant Eagle, Market District or GetGo stores. Also, customers can earn five perks for every prescription filled at Giant Eagle or Market District. At GetGo, customers earn two perks per gallon of gas. Once 50 perks is reached, customers can choose between 2% off on groceries (maximum discount 20% off or $10,000) or 10 cents off each gallon of gas (up to 30 free gallons per one vehicle). As in the previous fuelperks! program, if customers have more than the price of gasoline or more than the 20%, those discounts will remain on their Advantage Card for the remainder of the 60 day time period.

In late 2021, Giant Eagle began to roll out another new system, myPerks and myPerks Pro. Customers that are members of either myPerks tier can take advantage of exclusive sale prices, and earn bonus points on certain items and on certain days. Standard myPerks members receive 1 perk for each dollar spent, 2 perks for each gallon of gas, and 2 perks per dollar for Giant Eagle brand items. myPerks Pro members receive 1.5 perks per dollar spent, 3 perks per gallon, and 3 perks per dollar for Giant Eagle brand items. Every 50 perks a customer earns can be used to take 1 dollar off of their order on either groceries or gas. If customers have more than their total bill, the remaining dollar amount will remain on their card. For standard myPerks customers, these perks have a 90 day expiration, while myPerks Pro members have a 365 day expiration. In order to become and stay a myPerks Pro member, customers must earn 2,500 perks within a 6-month period, or make 25 trips to GetGo within a 6-month period. Switching from fuelperks+ to myPerks became an option for all customers in 2022, prompting them to switch on the screens at the registers.

Operations

There are 216 Giant Eagle Supermarkets and 202 GetGo locations in the United States: 99 in western Pennsylvania, 122 in northeastern and central Ohio, two in Morgantown, West Virginia, two in Frederick, Maryland and one in Carmel, Indiana. Each store carries between 22,000 and 60,000 items, approximately 5,000 of which are branded by Giant Eagle.

Giant Eagle offers more than two dozen departments across its stores. The range of services includes Redbox video terminals, dry cleaning, in-store day care, and pharmacies. Giant Eagle also has banking partnerships with Citizens Bank in Pennsylvania and Huntington Bank in Ohio and West Virginia, both of which have their branches open inside Giant Eagle branches seven days a week except for federal holidays.

The chain has built large prototypes, and it has experimented with many departments unusual to supermarkets. Larger stores feature vast selections of ethnic and organic food, dry cleaning services, Iggle video, drive-thru pharmacies, in-store banking, Eagle's Nest (for daycare purposes while shopping), as well as in-store coffee shops and prepared foods. Prepared foods are also sold at larger GetGo locations that can accommodate a GetGo Kitchen.

Although older Giant Eagle locations tend to be unionized and some are even franchised stores, in recent years the company has started leaning toward non-union company-owned and -operated stores. In areas where a franchised store exists, if a GetGo exists nearby, it's operated by Giant Eagle itself, separate from the franchised supermarket.

Current brands

Market District

Giant Eagle rebranded some of its stores as Market District in an attempt to attract upscale shoppers. The initial two stores opened in June 2006 in the Shadyside neighborhood of Pittsburgh, and Bethel Park, just outside Pittsburgh. The Giant Eagle name appears above the logo on the rebranded stores. There are now 13 stores under this brand. The 14th store is now open in the Cleveland suburb of Westlake, Ohio. That store is a result of Giant Eagle's closing their existing Westlake location in October 2018 for six months to do extensive renovations.

Giant Eagle Express

Giant Eagle Express is a concept store. As of May 2016, the only operating store is in Harmar Township, Pennsylvania. An Indiana, Pennsylvania location closed its doors in 2015. The store is larger than a GetGo, but much smaller than a regular Giant Eagle supermarket store. However, the store offers many of the same services as a Giant Eagle, such as a deli and a drive-through pharmacy. Giant Eagle Express also offers a café with prepared sandwiches, Giant Eagle's own Market District coffee, salad bar, and a wireless internet connection. There is also a GetGo gas station.

Market District Express

On June 4, 2013, Giant Eagle announced new Market District Express concept, which is designed to be a hybrid of the flagship Market District format launched in 2006 with the Giant Eagle Express format that was launched in 2007. The first of this brand's stores opened on December 5, 2013, in Peters Township, Pennsylvania. The second Market District Express store opened on August 18, 2016, in Bexley, Ohio. The Bexley location is notable as it features a full restaurant and bar inside, alongside groceries in a 30,000 square foot store that spans two floors.

GetGo

GetGo is a convenience store chain that also has gas stations.

Giant Eagle Pharmacy

Giant Eagle began adding pharmacies to their stores in the 1980s, along with other "store-within-a-store" concepts photo, floral, and video rental. Giant Eagle Pharmacy also offers several immunizations throughout the year for pneumonia, influenza, and Shingrix. These are typically walk-in, but vary depending on the pharmacists available.

Until 2021, all Giant Eagle Pharmacy locations were located inside standard Giant Eagle and Market District locations. This changed when a standalone Giant Eagle Pharmacy opened in Columbus's German Village neighborhood after Giant Eagle opted not to renew its lease at the existing Giant Eagle location in the area, allowing for the property to be redeveloped. The location opened in a former Lawson's, and assumed the prescription accounts from the previous location.

Giant Eagle Contact Lenses

Giant Eagle partnered with Arlington Lens Supply in 2010 to sell contact lenses online via their website.

Ricker Oil Company, Inc.

Ricker's is a 56-chain, Indiana-based convenience store and gas station chain purchased by Giant Eagle in 2018.

Starbucks

Giant Eagle has a contract to operate Starbucks kiosks in some of its stores; the workers are employed by Giant Eagle, but become certified baristas after completing the process.

Defunct brands

Phar-Mor

Giant Eagle was the largest shareholder of the Phar-Mor chain during its heyday in the 1980s and 1990s, although it was operated separate from the main Giant Eagle chain. The Shapira family who owns Giant Eagle provided Phar-Mor founder Mickey Monus with the financing necessary to start his chain. After Monus was convicted of embezzlement, Phar-Mor filed for bankruptcy and eventually liquidated. Due to Giant Eagle's stake in Phar-Mor, it was able to acquire Phar-Mor's Youngstown-area assets in bankruptcy court after the chain liquidated.

Iggle Video

Giant Eagle once operated Iggle Video locations inside many of its locations to serve as its video rental shop. Like Giant Eagle Pharmacy, Iggle Video (which spelled "eagle" from its phonetic pronunciation in Pittsburghese, even outside of Pittsburgh) never operated in stand-alone locations. Like other video rental chains, Iggle Video offered movie and video game rentals. They also served as the local Ticketmaster outlet in the Pittsburgh region before the advent of the Internet made it possible to buy live event tickets from Ticketmaster online. In the mid- to late 2000s, Giant Eagle phased these stores out in favor of Redbox automated retail machines, with Ticketmaster sales moved to the customer service desk.

Giant Eagle Optical

In October 2004, Giant Eagle began a long-term experiment with in-store optometry centers dubbed "Giant Eagle Optical". There were four locations in the Pittsburgh area: North Hills (McIntyre Square), South Hills (Donaldson's Crossroads), east (Monroeville), and west (Robinson). The stores accepted most major vision plans and offered a wide variety of designer frames, as well as exclusive Giant Eagle brands. They also participated in the Fuelperks! program and were staffed mostly by ABO-certified opticians. Noting that "some programs don't prove viable across a broad number of stores", Giant Eagle chose to close its Optical locations beginning in August 2009.

Valu King and Good Cents

In December 2008, Giant Eagle opened the rebranded Valu King supermarket in Eastlake, Ohio. The Valu King name dates back to the 1980s. The rebranded Valu King operated stores in Eastlake, Ravenna, and Brooklyn in Ohio and Johnstown and Erie in Pennsylvania, with the most recent store opened in May 2012.

In 2012, Giant Eagle opened a new low-cost supermarket concept called Good Cents, located in Ross Township, Pennsylvania. The concept is similar to that of a Valu King, but carries a slightly larger product selection. Good Cents eventually replaced all rebranded Valu King as Giant Eagle's low-cost brand.

Good Cents and Valu King both were no frills stores designed to compete with similar stores such as Aldi, Save-A-Lot, and Bottom Dollar Food.

On February 25, 2015 (Wednesday), Giant Eagle announced it would close all the Good Cents stores by the end of March. It was looking for open spots at nearby Giant Eagle locations for displaced employees.

On March 2, 2015 (Monday), all Good Cents stores were sold and closed.

Employees

Giant Eagle has about 32,000 employees and many of them are unionized under United Food and Commercial Workers Local 1776ks of Pittsburgh, AFGE and UFCW Local 880 of Cleveland. The Maryland and Columbus stores are not unionized, much like some independently owned stores throughout Pennsylvania and the Youngstown, Ohio area. Some employees in the Eagle's Nest and Photo Lab departments are also non-union employees.

Advertising

Giant Eagle currently uses the slogan "That's Another Giant Eagle Advantage" with its advertising, focusing on the eAdvantage offer of the week. This campaign features store employees and customers, that put their own spin on what Giant Eagle offers. The campaign includes a focus on product selection, quality, customer service, and price leadership.

From 2011 to 2014 the slogan was "That's my Giant Eagle Advantage". From 2009 until 2011, the slogan was "Low prices. Uncompromising quality." In December 2009, a variation being used was "Lower prices. Uncompromising quality." for online advertisements on thepittsburghchannel.com website.

From 2001 until 2009, the slogan "Make every day taste better", was used. It was meant to showcase product quality as compared to the convenience focus used in the previous campaign.

From 1993 until 2001, "it takes a giant to make life simple" was used as the slogan. This was focused on convenience, and spawned the "Fee Fi Fo Fum" commercials. The commercials featured everything from the general store, the produce and deli departments to a spot featuring Jay Bell and Jeff King of the Pittsburgh Pirates. This replaced the previous "A lot you can feel good about... especially the price" motto.

The chain, under pressure from Wal-Mart, has implemented a lower-prices campaign throughout its stores, featured on products that customers buy most. Giant Eagle also sells Topco-produced Valu Time products, which are substantially cheaper than other private-label and name-brand merchandise. These co-exist with the Giant Eagle branded items, which are priced lower than national brands, yet higher than Valu Time. Before these brands existed, Giant Eagle generally used Topco's Food Club label as the generic product.

Criticism

Giant Eagle has the highest market share of any supermarket chain in the Pittsburgh area, giving it a de facto monopoly in some parts of western Pennsylvania; only stores supplied by United Natural Foods (UNFI) such as Shop 'n Save, FoodLand, and County Market have much of a presence in the area.  The construction of new supercenters, including Walmart and others, and no frills supermarkets such as Aldi attracting value-seeking customers have somewhat decreased Giant Eagle's regional market share in the first decades of the twenty-first century.

Giant Eagle's market dominance in Greater Pittsburgh has led to accusations of the company buying up either existing supermarket locations or prime real estate for the sole purpose of not allowing a competitor come in. A notable example came in 2016, when the chain purchased property in McCandless, Pennsylvania that had been planned for a Walmart location near an existing Giant Eagle; Walmart later backed out and Giant Eagle made no immediate announcement of plans for the property. The deal came only weeks after Giant Eagle laid off 350 workers from its corporate office. Similar accusations have been made about GetGo not allowing Sheetz or Speedway opening up locations within the Pittsburgh city limits while GetGo has, although both competitor chains have several locations within the immediate suburbs; 7-Eleven's 2021 acquisition of Speedway made the issue partially moot as 7-Eleven has operated multiple locations within the Pittsburgh city limits for decades, though Sheetz remains "locked out" by GetGo. Giant Eagle was also successful in blocking a Walmart location opening at the dilapidated Northern Lights Shopping Center in Economy, Pennsylvania, though Walmart eventually opened a location on the hillside behind the property in 2014 after finding a loophole around Giant Eagle's lease at Northern Lights; Giant Eagle ultimately closed this location on January 2, 2021.

Before Walmart, Giant Eagle's last nationally-significant competitor in the Pittsburgh market was Kroger, which had bought the original Eagle but exited Western Pennsylvania in 1984 due to labor issues with its union as well as the local economy at the time. Many Giant Eagle locations in Pennsylvania and Northeast Ohio occupy former Kroger sites and used the distinctive Kroger prototypes from the 1980s with the sloped glass-roof entrance until most of the stores were remodeled or replaced with newer stores in the early 2000s with Giant Eagle's current prototype. Kroger and Giant Eagle still compete head-to-head in Morgantown, Columbus and Indianapolis.

Despite the perceived monopoly, Giant Eagle holds only a 32% market share in Pittsburgh as of August 2018, just barely edging out Walmart.

References

External links

Market District's official website

Privately held companies based in Pennsylvania
Economy of the Eastern United States
Supermarkets of the United States
American companies established in 1931
Companies based in Allegheny County, Pennsylvania
1931 establishments in Pennsylvania